Thantikandh is a rural municipality located in Dailekh District of Karnali Province of Nepal.

The rural municipality is divided into total 6 wards.

The rural municipality was established on 10 March 2017, when Government of Nepal restricted all old administrative structure and announced 744 local level units (although the number increased to 753 later) as per the new constitution of Nepal 2015.

Lakhandra, Bisalla and Tolijaisi Village development committees were incorporated to form this new rural municipality. The headquarters of the municipality is situated at Lakhandra.

Demographics
At the time of the 2011 Nepal census, 99.3% of the population in Thantikandh Rural Municipality spoke Nepali, 0.6% Magar and 0.1% Kham as their first language.

In terms of ethnicity/caste, 35.6% were Chhetri, 28.0% Thakuri, 23.9% Kami, 4.3% Hill Brahmin, 4.1% Magar, 3.8% Damai/Dholi, 0.1% Lohar and 0.2% others.

In terms of religion, 99.9% were Hindu and 0.1% Buddhist.

References

External links
 http://www.thantikandhmun.gov.np/
 https://www.citypopulation.de/php/nepal-mun-admin.php?adm2id=6011

Populated places in Dailekh District
Rural municipalities in Karnali Province
Rural municipalities of Nepal established in 2017